Oleksandr Kozarenko (August 24, 1963) is a Ukrainian composer, pianist and musicologist who was born in Kolomyia of Ivano-Frankivsk Oblast.

Background
He was a graduate of Kiev Conservatory where he took piano lessons from Volodymyr Vorobyov and composition with Myroslav Skoryk. In 1984 he became a winner of the Mykola Lysenko International Music Competition and two years later won All-Ukrainian Competition diploma. Ten years later he became a recipient of the Levko Revutsky Prize following by Mykola Lysenko Prize by 2001. Since 2000 he has been a vice-principal of the Lviv Music Academy where he also was a ballet, opera, and symphonic composer. He has composed works for Kyiv Kamerata and Trembita Capella. He is also known for his participation on numerous festivals such as Bratislava's Melos-Ethos and Days of the Kraków Composers Music as well as his national debut at the Two Days and Two Nights of New Music festival in Odessa. Since 1991 he composed such works as the Concerto Rutheno, Don Juan from Kolomea  and Passion of Our God Jesus Christ. In 1996 and 1998 he did compositions by other composers such as the David's Psalter and Oresteia among other works.

References

1963 births
Living people
Ukrainian classical composers
Ukrainian pianists
Ukrainian musicologists
Kyiv Conservatory alumni
20th-century composers
20th-century pianists
21st-century pianists